Araeolampas atlantica is a species of sea urchin of the family Loveniidae. Their armour is covered with spines. It is placed in the genus Arachnoides and lives in the sea. Araeolampas atlantica was first scientifically described in 1974 by K. Serafy.

References 

Spatangoida
Animals described in 1974